Walter Ernest Webber (July 31, 1943April 22, 2006) was an American lawyer and Freemason who served as the nineteenth Sovereign Grand Commander of the Scottish Rite of Freemasonry for the Northern Jurisdiction of the United States between 2003 and 2006.

A member of the American Bar Association, he was regularly listed in The Best Lawyers in America.

Early life 
Webber was born in Old Town, Maine, to Philip and Velma Webber.

He was a 1965 graduate of Marietta College in Ohio. At his commencement, he was awarded the William Bay Irvine Award, an acknowledgment of being an outstanding member of his class. He later served on the college's board of trustees, and became vice-chairman of the board.

Webber graduated from Boston College Law School in 1969.

Career 
Webber worked for many years as a lawyer for Jensen Baird Gardner & Henry in Portland, Maine, whom he joined upon graduation in 1969. He later became one of its senior directors and its first president.

Personal life 
Webber moved to Yarmouth, Maine, in 1970. He became a long-term member of the town's First Parish Congregational Church, and served on its board of trustees. He was also chairman of the board of York Mutual Insurance Company of Maine and of Maine Medical Center's Brighton Campus (then known as the Osteopathic Hospital of Maine).

In September 2003, he moved to Lexington, Massachusetts, after accepting the role of Sovereign Grand Commander of the Scottish Rite of Freemasonry for the Northern Jurisdiction of the United States, succeeding Robert Odel Ralston. A 33rd Degree Mason since 1987, Webber had been the District Deputy Grand Master of the Grand Lodge of Maine for many years, and was elected to the board of directors of the Scottish Rite Supreme Council in 1994. That year, he helped establish the 32nd Degree Masonic Learning Centers for Children, which afforded children with dyslexia one-on-one tutoring at over fifty centers in the Northeastern and Midwestern states.

Also in 2003, Webber was awarded the Josiah Drummond Medal by the Grand Lodge of Maine. Drummond, himself, had earlier served in the same position as Webber in the Scottish Rite, the post of Sovereign Grand Commander.

Webber was married for 41 years to Leslie, with whom he had three children.

Death 
Webber died of cancer on April 22, 2006, in Lexington, Massachusetts, aged 62. A memorial service was held at the Scottish Rite Masonic Museum & Library (of which he was president) on April 30.

John William McNaughton succeeded him as the twentieth Sovereign Grand Commander of the Northern Jurisdiction.

Legacy 
In 2001, a scholarship fund was established in his name by the trustees of Marietta College. The fund provided financial assistance to "worthy and deserving students."

A portrait of Webber hangs in the Reading Room of the Masonic Hall in Portland.

References 

1943 births
2006 deaths
People from Old Town, Maine
People from Yarmouth, Maine
20th-century American lawyers
21st-century American lawyers
Maine lawyers
American Freemasons
Deaths from cancer
Marietta College alumni
Boston College Law School alumni